Jenifer Fays Alys Tennison (born 1972)  is a British software engineer and consultant who co-chairs the data governance working group within the Global Partnership on Artificial Intelligence (GPAI). She also serves on the board of directors of Creative Commons, the Global Partnership for Sustainable Development Data (GPSDD) and the information law and policy centre of the School of Advanced Study (SAS) at the University of London. She was previously Chief Executive Officer (CEO) of the Open Data Institute (ODI).

Education
Tennison was born in Cambridge, England and educated at the University of Nottingham gaining a Bachelor of Science degree in Psychology in 1994 and a PhD in collaborative ontology development in 1999, supervised by Nigel Shadbolt.

Career 
Tennison has been the technical architect and lead developer for legislation.gov.uk and previously worked on the linked data aspects of data.gov.uk. Previously, she was self-employed as a consultant.

Tennison has authored or co-authored papers on XSLT, XML, structured data and knowledge bases. She has authored books including Beginning XSLT 2.0, XSLT and XPath on the Edge and Professional XML Schemas. Tennison was an invited expert on the XSL and XML processing working groups at the World Wide Web Consortium (W3C) and was appointed to the W3C's Technical Architecture Group (TAG) in 2011. She has previously worked for the Open Knowledge Foundation and Epistemics Ltd.

Tennison is the co-creator of the open data board game Datopolis.

Awards and honours
Tennison was appointed Officer of the Most Excellent Order of the British Empire (OBE) in the 2014 New Year Honours for services to Technology and Open Data.

References 

Semantic Web people
XML Guild
Officers of the Order of the British Empire
Living people
1972 births